"Morella" is a short story in the Gothic horror genre by 19th-century American author and critic Edgar Allan Poe.

Plot summary
An unnamed narrator marries Morella, a woman with great scholarly knowledge who delves into studies of the German philosophers Fichte and Schelling, dealing with the question of identity. Morella spends her time in bed reading and teaching her husband. Realizing her physical deterioration, her husband, the narrator, becomes frightened and wishes for his wife's death and eternal peace. Eventually, Morella dies in childbirth proclaiming: "I am dying. But within me is a pledge of that affection... which thou didst feel for me, Morella. And when my spirit departs shall the child live."

As the daughter gets older the narrator notices she bears an uncanny resemblance to her mother, but he refuses to give the child a name. By her tenth birthday the resemblance to Morella is frightening. Her father decides to have her baptized to release any evil from her, but this event brings the mother's soul back into her daughter. At the ceremony, the priest asks the daughter's name, to which the narrator replies "Morella". Immediately, the daughter calls out, "I am here!" and dies. The narrator himself bears her body to the tomb and finds no trace of the first Morella where he lays the second.

Analysis
The narrator's decision to name his daughter Morella implies his subconscious desire for her death, just as he had for her mother. Allen Tate suggested that Morella's rebirth may be her becoming a vampire to wreak vengeance on the narrator.

Poe explores the idea of what happens to identity after death, suggesting that if identity survived death it could exist outside the human body and return to new bodies. He was influenced in part by the theories of identity by Friedrich Wilhelm Joseph Schelling, whom he mentions in the story.

There are a number of possible origins for the name "Morella". It is the name of the Venerable Mother Juliana Morell (1595–1653), who was the fourth Grace and tenth Muse in a poem by poet Lope de Vega. "Morel" is the name of black nightshade, a poisonous weed related to one from which the drug belladonna is derived. It occurs in Presburg (now Bratislava), a reputed home of black magic where Morella is said to have received her education.

Major themes
Poe features dead or dying women in many of his tales (see also "Berenice", "Ligeia") and resurrection or communication from beyond the grave (see "Eleonora", "The Fall of the House of Usher").

Publication history
"Morella" was first published in the April 1835 issue of the Southern Literary Messenger, and a revised version was re-printed in the November 1839 issue of Burton's Gentleman's Magazine. The first publication included a 16-line poem of Poe's called "Hymn" sung by Morella, later published as a stand-alone poem, "A Catholic Hymn".

Adaptations
"Morella" is the title of one segment of Roger Corman's 1962 film Tales of Terror. The film stars Vincent Price, Peter Lorre, and Basil Rathbone. The film has two other segments named after "The Black Cat" and "The Facts in the Case of M. Valdemar".

The story was loosely adapted as The Haunting of Morella (1990), directed by Jim Wynorski.

Notes

References
 Sova, Dawn B. Edgar Allan Poe: A to Z. Checkmark Books, 2001.

External links

Morella, analysis, summary and interpretation.
 

1835 short stories
Fiction with unreliable narrators
Horror short stories
Short stories adapted into films
Short stories by Edgar Allan Poe
Works originally published in the Southern Literary Messenger